The 2002–03 NBA season was the Warriors' 57th season in the National Basketball Association, and 41st in the San Francisco Bay Area. In the 2002 NBA draft, the Warriors had the third overall pick and selected Mike Dunleavy Jr. out of Duke University. In November, the team signed free agent Earl Boykins. Under new head coach Eric Musselman, the Warriors got off to a slow start losing six of their first seven games. However, they began to show signs of life by winning six straight games between February and March. For the first time in nearly a decade, the Warriors reached the .500 mark late in the season with a 30–30 record as of March 4. However, they would win just eight of their final 22 games to finish sixth in the Pacific Division with a 38–44 record.

Second-year guard Gilbert Arenas was named Most Improved Player of the Year, averaging 18.3 points, 4.7 rebounds, 6.3 assists and 1.5 steals per game, and also won the MVP award in the Rookie-Sophomore Game during the All-Star Weekend. In addition, Antawn Jamison averaged 22.2 points and 7.0 rebounds per game, while second-year star Jason Richardson averaged 15.6 points per game, and won the Slam Dunk Contest during the All-Star Weekend in Atlanta for the second year in a row, second-year forward Troy Murphy provided the team with 11.7 points and 10.2 rebounds per game, and Boykins contributed 8.8 points and 3.3 assists per game off the bench. On the defensive side, Erick Dampier averaged 8.2 points, 6.6 rebounds and 1.9 blocks per game, and Adonal Foyle contributed 6.0 rebounds and led the team with 2.5 blocks per game.

Following the season, Arenas signed as a free agent with the Washington Wizards, while Jamison and Danny Fortson were both traded to the Dallas Mavericks, Bob Sura was dealt to the Detroit Pistons, Boykins signed as a free agent with the Denver Nuggets, and Chris Mills retired.

For the season, the team added side panels to their uniforms, which remained in use until 2010.

Draft

Roster

Regular season

Season standings

z - clinched division title
y - clinched division title
x - clinched playoff spot

Record vs. opponents

Game log

Player statistics

Season

Awards and records

Transactions

References

See also
 2002-03 NBA season

Golden State Warriors seasons
Golden
Golden
Golden State